Ilhom Suyunov (born 17 May 1983) is an Uzbekistani footballer currently playing for Uzbek League club Lokomotiv Tashkent as a defender.

Career
In 2004–2013 Suyunov played for Pakhtakor Tashkent. On 12 July 2013 he signed a contract with Lokomotiv Tashkent after playing 10 seasons for Pakhtakor.

International
Suyunov has made 21 appearances for the Uzbekistan national football team, scoring 1 goal.

Honours
Pakhtakor
 Uzbek League (5):  2004, 2005, 2006, 2007, 2012
 Uzbek Cup (6): 2004, 2005, 2006, 2007, 2009, 2011
 CIS cup: 2007
 AFC Champions League Semi-final (1): 2004

Lokomotiv
 Uzbek League runner-up (1): 2013

Career statistics

Goals for Senior National Team

References

External links
 
 Ilhom Suyunov Profile- KLISF
 

Uzbekistani footballers
Uzbekistan international footballers
Pakhtakor Tashkent FK players
1983 births
Living people
Footballers at the 2006 Asian Games
Association football defenders
Asian Games competitors for Uzbekistan